The literature of Georgia, United States, includes fiction, poetry, and nonfiction. Representative writers include Erskine Caldwell, Carson McCullers, Margaret Mitchell, Flannery O’Connor, Charles Henry Smith, and Alice Walker.

History

A printing press began operating in Savannah in 1762.

Writers of the antebellum period included Thomas Holley Chivers (1809-1858), Richard Henry Wilde (1789-1847). In 1838 in Augusta, William Tappan Thompson founded the "first literary journal in Georgia," the Mirror.

Joel Chandler Harris (1848-1908) wrote the bestselling Uncle Remus stories, first published in 1880, a "retelling [of] African American folktales."

Jean Toomer (1894-1967) wrote the novel Cane after "a three-month sojourn in Sparta."

Organizations
The Georgia Writers Association formed in 1994.

See also

 :Category:Writers from Georgia (U.S. state)
 List of newspapers in Georgia (U.S. state)
 :Category:Georgia (U.S. state) in fiction
 :Category:Libraries in Georgia (U.S. state)
 Southern United States literature
 American literary regionalism

References

Bibliography

  
 
 
 
  (Includes information about Georgia literature)
 Hugh Ruppersburg, ed., Georgia Voices: Fiction (Athens: University of Georgia Press, 1992).
 Hugh Ruppersburg, ed., Georgia Voices: Nonfiction (Athens: University of Georgia Press, 1994).
 Michael E. Price, Stories with a Moral: Literature and Society in Nineteenth-Century Georgia (Athens: University of Georgia Press, 2000).
 Hugh Ruppersburg, ed., Georgia Voices: Poetry (Athens: University of Georgia Press, 2000).
 
 Hugh Ruppersburg, ed., After O'Connor: Stories from Contemporary Georgia (Athens: University of Georgia Press, 2003).

External links
 
  (Fulltext; mostly 19th-early 20th c.)
 
 
  (Directory ceased in 2017)

georgia
literature